South Korea national amateur boxing athletes represents South Korea in regional, continental and world matches and tournaments sanctioned by the Amateur International Boxing Association (AIBA).

Olympics

2004 Athens Olympics

Seven amateur boxers represented South Korea in this edition of the Olympiad winning two bronze medals from the Featherweight and the Welterweight division. This country is ranked 12th in a four-way tie in the boxing medal tally.

Entry list
 Hong Moo Won (Light Flyweight)
 Kim Kim-suk (Flyweight)
 Kim Won Il (Bantamweight)
 Seok Hwan Jo (Featherweight) - Bronze
 Jong Sub Baik (Lightweight)
 Kim Jung Joo (Welterweight) - Bronze
 Song Hak Sung (Light heavyweight)

Asian Games

2006 Doha Asian Games

Ten amateur boxers represented Korea in this edition of the Asiad, winning three silver medals and one bronze medal. This country is ranked 8th with a total of 4 medals.

Entry list
 A'nyo Lee Jynnings {Heavyweight) - Gold
 Jong Sub Baik (Lightweight)
 Deok Jin Cho (Middleweight)
 Soon Chul Han (Bantamweight) - Silver
 Moo Won Hong (Light Flyweight) - Bronze
 Byeong Gook Jeon (Heavyweight)
 Seok Hwan Jo (Featherweight)
 Kim Jung Joo (Welterweight)
 Ok Sung Lee (Flyweight)
 Myung Hoon Shin (Lightwelterweight) - Silver
 Hak Sung Song (Light Heavyweight) - Silver

2010 youth boxing state finalists
 Ko Un (Lightweight) 
 Kim Sowol (Lightweight)  (Vice Captain)
 Yun Dong-ju (Lightweight)- Gold
 Han Jung-Woo (Lightweight)(Captain)- Bronze 
 Park Mok-wol (Light Heavyweight)
 Park Kyung-ni (Flyweight)
 Han Yong-un (Lightweight) - Bronze

References

Korea, South
Amateur boxing
Boxing in South Korea